A good number of inscriptions written in Sanskrit language have been found in Malaysia and Indonesia (in Indonesian known as Prasasti). "Early inscriptions written in Indian languages and scripts abound in Southeast Asia. [...] The fact that southern Indian languages didn't travel eastwards along with the script further suggests that the main carriers of ideas from the southeast coast of India to the east - and the main users in Southeast Asia of religious texts written in Sanskrit and Pali - were Southeast Asians themselves. The spread of these north Indian sacred languages thus provides no specific evidence for any movements of South Asian individuals or groups to Southeast Asia.

Notable inscriptions

Kutai inscriptions 

The oldest known inscriptions in Indonesia are the Kutai inscriptions, or the Muarakaman inscriptions, which are those on seven stone pillars, or yupa (“sacrificial posts”), found in the eastern part of Borneo, in the area of Kutai, East Kalimantan province. They are written in the early Pallava script, in the Sanskrit language, and commemorate sacrifices held by a king called Mulavarman. Based on palaeographical grounds, they have been dated to the second half of the 4th century AD. They attest to the emergence of an Indianized state in the Indonesian archipelago prior to AD 400, and hence Old Kutai Kingdom is the earliest known Indianized polity in Indonesia.

In addition to Mulavarman, the reigning king, the inscriptions mention the names of his father Asvavarman and his grandfather Kundungga. It is generally agreed that Kundungga is not a Sanskrit name, but one of native origin. The fact that his son Asvavarman is the first of the line to bear a Sanskrit name indicates that he was probably also the first to adhere to Hinduism.

Tugu Inscription 

The Tugu inscription is one several inscriptions associated to Tarumanagara, discovered in Batutumbuh hamlet, Tugu village, Koja, North Jakarta, in Indonesia. The inscription contains information about hydraulic projects; the irrigation and water drainage project of the Chandrabhaga river by the order of a certain Rajadirajaguru, and also the water project of the Gomati river by the order of King Purnawarman in the 22nd year of his reign. The digging project to straighten and widen the river was conducted in order to avoid flooding in the wet season, and as an irrigation project during the dry season.

The Tugu inscription was written in Pallava script arranged in the form of Sanskrit Sloka with Anustubh metrum, consisting of five lines that run around the surface of the stone. Just like other inscriptions from the Tarumanagara kingdom, the Tugu inscriptions do not mention the date of the edict. The date of the inscriptions was estimated and analyzed according to paleographic study which concluded that the inscriptions originated from the mid 5th century. The script of the Tugu inscription and the Cidanghyang inscription bear striking similarity, such as the script "citralaikha" written as "citralekha", leading to the assumption that the writer of these inscriptions was the same person.

The Tugu inscription is the longest Tarumanagara inscription pronounced by edict of Sri Maharaja Purnawarman. The inscription was made during the 22nd year of his reign, to commemorate the completion of the canals of the Gomati and Candrabhaga rivers. On the inscription there is an image of a staff crowned with Trisula straight to mark the separation between the beginning and the end of each sentence.

Kedah Inscription 
An inscription in Sanskrit dated 1086 has been found in Kedah. This was left by Kulothunga Chola I (of the Chola empire, Tamil country). This too shows the commercial contacts the Chola Empire had with Malaysia.

Ligor Inscription 
An inscription was found on the Southern Thailand Malay peninsula, at Nakhon Si Thammarat. It has been dubbed the Ligor inscription, being the name given by Europeans to the region in the 16th and 17th centuries. It is written in Sanskrit  and bears the date of 775 AD. One side of the inscription refers to the Illustrious Great Monarch (śrīmahārāja) belonging to the "Lord of the Mountain" dynasty (śailendravaṁśa), which is also mentioned in four Sanskrit inscriptions from Central Java; the other side refers to the founding of several Buddhist sanctuaries by a king of Srivijaya. Srivijaya is the name of a kingdom whose centre was located in the modern city of Palembang in South Sumatra province, Indonesia. 
The Ligor inscription has been known in the list of inscription of Thailand as "Inscription No. 23 : Inscription of Wat Sema Mueang" which has been found at Wat Sema Mueang, Wiang Sak township, Mueang district of Nakhon Srithammarat in 1907 by Prince Damrongrachaniphab when he was Ministry of Interior during the annual inspection trip with the era recorded in the inscription as "Maha Sakkarat 697" (AD 775) 
The Ligor inscription is testimony to an expansion of Sriwijaya power to the peninsula.

List of Sanskrit inscriptions throughout the Malay archipelago

See also 
 Tamil inscriptions in the Malay world
 Symbolic usage of Sanskrit
 Indianisation
 Sanskritisation
 Indosphere
 Greater India

Notes

References

Malaysia
History of Malaysia
Indian diaspora in Indonesia
Indian-Malaysian culture
History of Indonesia